Yasser Al-Baadani (born February 2, 1986, in Yemen) is a Yemeni football defender currently playing for Al Sha'ab Ibb.  He is a member of the Yemen national football team.

Honours

Club
Al-Sha'ab Ibb'

Yemeni League: 2
2002–03, 2003–04
Yemeni President Cup: 2
2002, 2003
Yemeni September 26 Cup: 1
2002

Country
Yemen U17
FIFA U-17 World Cup
Group Stage: 2003
 AFC U-17 Championship
Runner-up: 2002 AFC U-17 Championship

International goals

External links 
 

1986 births
Living people
Association football defenders
Yemeni footballers
Yemen international footballers
Al Sha'ab Ibb players
Al-Hilal Al-Sahili players
Yemeni League players